Folkestra, formerly known as FolkESTRA North is The Sage Gateshead’s youth folk ensemble, formed in 2001. It is led by their Musical Director Ian Stevenson, a multi-instrumentalist playing folk and traditional music from Northumbria and Scandinavia. The former Musical Director was Kathryn Tickell, one of England's premiere folk musicians.

They have performed at a wide range of concerts, recorded and published their self entitled album, "FolkESTRA North", and taken part in festivals including the National Festival of Youth Music, Sidmouth International Festival and Towersey Village Festival.

In Easter of 2005, Folkestra took part in a UK tour called "The Road to the North" to celebrate the rich traditional music of the North East of England.  They performed here alongside The Kathryn Tickell Band, Alistair Anderson, Louis Killen, and the Old Rope String Band. With two successful CDs and a growing national reputation, Folkestra have performed at many concerts and festivals across the country, and also at the BBC Proms first ever Folk Day at the Royal Albert Hall. In the summer of 2012, Folkestra are to perform at Traflgar Square in the River of Music festival.

Folkestra's 15 band members play a wide variety of instruments, including fiddles, an accordion, a melodeon, a whistle, a flute, guitars, a saxophone, northumbrian pipes, double bass, voices, and foot percussion.

English folk musical groups
Culture in Tyne and Wear